Marie Louise "Liza" Araneta Marcos ( Marie Louise Cacho Araneta; born August 21, 1959) is a Filipina lawyer and academic who is the spouse of Bongbong Marcos, the 17th president of the Philippines, making her the first lady of the Philippines. Born in Manila, Araneta Marcos is a graduate of the Ateneo de Manila University and completed her post-graduate courses at the New York University.

A lawyer and professor by profession, she taught in various universities in the country, before being a founding member at MOST (Marcos, Ochoa, Serapio & Tan) Law Firm and M&A Associates. She met Bongbong Marcos in New York City in 1989 before they got married in 1993. Araneta Marcos also served as the main strategist in her husband's presidential campaign, and is seen as one of the key people influencing her husband's presidency.

Early life and education
Liza Araneta was born on August 21, 1959, in Manila, Philippines, to Manuel L. Araneta Jr., a Filipino basketball Olympian who was born in Iloilo City but was raised in Bago, Negros Occidental, and Milagros A. Cacho. Both of her parents were of Spanish descent, and came from prominent political backgrounds, while her connection to the Araneta family is traced to her Basque roots.
Araneta is also first cousins with Jeric Soriano, the father of filmmaker Paul Soriano. She, along with her husband were also the principal sponsors of Soriano's marriage with actress Toni Gonzaga. Aside from being affiliated with the Marcos family, she also has a connection with the Roxas family, as her father is the first cousin of Judith "Judy" Araneta-Roxas, the mother of politician Mar Roxas, which makes her and the former interior secretary second cousins. She also has ties with the Cojuangco family, as Milagros' youngest sister, Rosario A. Cacho, was married to Pedro Cojuangco, the eldest brother of former president Corazon Aquino.

Araneta studied at the Ateneo de Manila University, where she graduated with a Bachelor of Arts in Interdisciplinary Studies in 1981, and got her Bachelor of Laws at the same university in 1985. After graduating from the Ateneo, Liza enrolled at the New York University, where she completed her post-graduate courses in criminal procedure.

Career
Araneta began her career as a lawyer in New York City after graduating from the New York University, and became a law professor in various law colleges and universities across the country. She began her teaching career at the Far Eastern University College of Law in Manila from 1996 to 1998, and at the Northwestern University College of Law in 1998 to 2006. In 2006, she temporarily stopped her career as a professor to become a founding member of the MOST (Marcos, Ochoa, Serapio & Tan) Law Firm. Araneta Marcos left the firm in January 2019 to start her own law firm, named M&A Associates.

Araneta Marcos eventually returned to teaching in 2010, where she became a professor at the Pamantasan ng Lungsod ng Maynila from 2010 to 2014, before moving to Saint Louis University in 2014 to 2018, and lastly at the Mariano Marcos State University (MMSU) College of Law from 2018 to 2020. During her time as a professor in MMSU, she also served as an assistant dean within the College of Law, before she ended her teaching career for a second time, after she struggled to adopt to the shift from face-to-face classes to online learning due to the COVID-19 pandemic.

Her claim on her online resume of being a member of the New York State Bar Association (NYSBA) was questioned in April 2022. In an email reply to Rappler, the NYSBA responded that she is not a member of their organization, stating that her name and variations of such name do not exist in their database. Vera Files also conducted a separate fact-checking research which ended in a similar conclusion.

First Lady of the Philippines (2022–present)

During the 2022 Philippine elections, Araneta Marcos served as the main strategist for her husband's presidential campaign, and collaborated with Paul Soriano in making Marcos' campaign advertisements. When it comes to certain political positions, Araneta Marcos favors the legalization of divorce in the Philippines but for "cogent reasons" maintaining that marriage should not be easily be dissolvable. She is also in favor legalizing abortion for in cases of pregnancies resulting from rape and incest as well as the legalizing same-sex relationships. Araneta-Marcos temporarily left her own law firm following her husband's victory in the 2022 elections, in order to fulfill her duties as First Lady of the Philippines. Her assumption of the role, marks the first time that the Philippines has a first lady since Loi Ejercito, the wife of President Joseph Estrada.

Aside from being the First Lady, Araneta Marcos continued her teaching career in part-time. In August 2022, she chose to teach criminal law part-time at West Visayas State University in Iloilo, her father's home province. On July 27, 2022, she hosted a meeting with United States Secretary of the Navy Carlos Del Toro and his wife, Betty Del Toro, and the United States Ambassador to the Philippines MaryKay Carlson. On August 3, 2022, Araneta Marcos hosted her first Malacañang event, as she hosted the lady ambassadors' luncheon, held at the Rizal Ceremonial Hall. On the same day, she also launched her own Facebook page. On August 4, 2022, she also held a luncheon with Chinese Ambassador Huang Xilian and his dignitaries. On August 8, 2022, Araneta Marcos served as the guest of honor in the 78th commencement exercises at the University of Batangas.

On August 9, 2022, Araneta Marcos served as the guest of honor at the graduation of the VIP Protection Course Class 128-2022 at the Presidential Security Group (PSG) Headquarters in Malacañang Park. On August 15, 2022, she attended the Indian Independence Day reception at the Shangri-La at the Fort, Manila. In a inauguration event on November 3, 2022, Araneta Marcos was named as the National President and Chief Girl Scout of the Girl Scouts of the Philippines.

Advocacies
As First Lady, Araneta Marcos has been involved in matters primarily on education and culture.

Being a former part-time criminal law professor, Araneta Marcos stressed the importance of education within the country, and launches measures to support students in need. During the opening of the Presidential Museum at the National Library of the Philippines, Araneta Marcos also emphasized the importance of libraries in the educational system, and has loaned over 40,000 books for organizing, cleaning, and repairs.

Aside from education, Araneta Marcos also initiated support programs on arts & crafts, and cultural activities, as she once spearheaded the full scale cultural mapping program within her husband's province, Ilocos Norte, during her time as the province's first lady. Araneta Marcos also launched cultural enhancement, preservation, industrial, and tourism programs which aims to support the local communities, particularly in the weaving industry. 

Araneta Marcos is also a known supporter for the arts, wherein she serves as one of the Board of Trustees at the Asian Cultural Council since 2016, and has inaugurated support programs for various artists.

Personal life
Lisa Araneta Marcos first met Bongbong Marcos, the son of former president Ferdinand Marcos and her would-be husband, in 1989 in New York City through mutual friends. Lisa was working as a lawyer at that time while Bongbong's family was in exile from the Philippines following the People Power Revolution of 1986. She and Bongbong got married on April 17, 1993 at the Church of St. Francis in Fiesole, Italy. They have three children, including Ilocos Norte's 1st district representative Sandro Marcos (born 1994). Araneta Marcos is known to be living in a private life prior to her husband's presidential bid, and rarely participates in interviews with the media. The Marcos family maintains a residence in Forbes Park, Makati.

Notes

References

	

Araneta family
Marcos family
Filipino women lawyers
Academic staff of Pamantasan ng Lungsod ng Maynila
Academic staff of Far Eastern University
1959 births
Filipino people of Spanish descent
Living people
Filipino people of Basque descent
Filipino academics
First Ladies and First Gentlemen of the Philippines
Spouses of presidents of the Philippines